Tomislav Čuljak (born 25 May 1987) is a Croatian professional footballer who most recently played as a defender for Bosnian Premier League club Široki Brijeg.

Club career
Born in Vinkovci, Čuljak kicked off his career in 2007 with hometown club Cibalia and in the early years of his career, he represented Cibalia and Zadar. In September 2014, he headed abroad for the first time and signed with Bosnian Premier League club Vitez where he joined fellow Croatian compatriot Toni Pezo.

After being released by Vitez, Čuljak returned to Croatia and signed with Osijek on a six-month contract in January 2015. In the next month, he made his debut against Dinamo Zagreb in a 1–1 draw. In 2016, Čuljak returned to Cibalia and received a red card in a league match in December against Hajduk Split.

In August 2017, Čuljak left Cibalia and moved to Istra 1961, signing a one-year deal. In February 2020, he again came back to Cibalia, but shortly after, signed a one-year contract with Bosnian Premier League club Široki Brijeg on 13 July 2020. Čuljak made his official debut for Široki Brijeg on 2 August 2020 in a league game against Tuzla City.

References

External links

Sportnet profile

1987 births
Living people
Sportspeople from Vinkovci
Association football defenders
Croatian footballers
HNK Cibalia players
NK Zadar players
HNK Šibenik players
NK Vitez players
NK Osijek players
NK Istra 1961 players
NK Široki Brijeg players
Croatian Football League players
First Football League (Croatia) players
Premier League of Bosnia and Herzegovina players
Croatian expatriate footballers
Expatriate footballers in Bosnia and Herzegovina
Croatian expatriate sportspeople in Bosnia and Herzegovina